Joseph Spence Mawson (26 October 1905 – 10 September 1959) was an English footballer who played in the Football League for Crewe Alexandra, Nottingham Forest, Stockport County and Stoke City.

Career
Mawson was born in Brandon, Durham and by the age of 24 he had already spent several years working at the coalface at Washington Colliery when he became one of a number of players discovered by Stoke City's north east scouts. Mawson had previously played for Crook Town, his works team Washington Colliery and Durham City. Raw and eager Mawson was given his debut in February 1929 at Swansea Town, in which he scored but his lack of guile and wayward passing soon relegated him to the reserves but his never say die attitude kept him in manager Tom Mather's plans.

Eventually Wilf Kirkham's horrific leg break on the opening day of the 1931–32 handed Mawson his chance in his natural position of centre forward. Stoke started the season poorly but the introduction of Mawson saw Stoke's fortunes turn around and he top scored with 24 goals. Stoke clearly had a squad now capable of challenging for promotion and the following season again top scored with 16 as Stoke won the Second Division title. However towards the end of the season Mawson, renowned for being a 'greedy' player squandered a number of easy chances against Plymouth Argyle as Stoke lost 1–0. A furious Mather dropped Mawson and brought in Reading's Jack Palethorpe who scored eight goals in ten games which put paid to Mawson's career at the Victoria Ground. He went on to play for Nottingham Forest, Stockport County, Linfield and Crewe Alexandra before World War II broke out.

Style of play
His style was to run with the ball and he scored the majority of his goals in a head down thrust through the middle, only looking up to beat the goalkeeper.

Career statistics
Source:

A.  The "Other" column constitutes appearances and goals in the Football League Third Division North Cup.

Honours
 Stoke City
 Football League Second Division champions: 1932–33

References

1905 births
1959 deaths
Association football forwards
English footballers
Crook Town A.F.C. players
Washington Colliery F.C. players
Durham City A.F.C. players
Stoke City F.C. players
Nottingham Forest F.C. players
Stockport County F.C. players
Linfield F.C. players
Crewe Alexandra F.C. players
English Football League players
People from Brandon, County Durham
Footballers from County Durham